Sir Edward MacMillan Taylor (18 April 1937 – 20 September 2017) was a British Conservative Party politician who was a Member of Parliament (MP) for forty years, from 1964 to 1979 for Glasgow Cathcart and from 1980 to 2005 for Southend East.

He was a lifelong Eurosceptic and leading member and vice-president of the Conservative Monday Club.

Early life and career

Taylor was born in Glasgow. After being educated at the High School of Glasgow and the University of Glasgow, which he attended with future Labour leader John Smith, he worked as a journalist on the Glasgow Herald and was a Glasgow City Councillor from 1960. He fought Glasgow Springburn at the 1959 general election, but he was beaten by Labour's John Forman.

Parliamentary career
He first entered Parliament in the 1964 election as MP for Glasgow Cathcart, at the time being the Baby of the House, as at 27 he was the youngest MP, although not for long as David Steel who was 26 entered Parliament five months later. He became a Scottish Office minister in Edward Heath's government. He resigned from this position in July 1971 in protest at the UK joining the European Economic Community. Because of his strong personal following, he held onto the working-class Glasgow constituency of Cathcart, one of only two Conservative seats in Glasgow in the 1970s.

He was a controversial figure in his time in Scottish politics, sometimes known as "dial-a-quote", or for his calls to bring back the birch (which had been abolished in 1948). Brian Wilson, journalist and later Labour MP, wrote that calling him by a nice cuddly name like "Teddy" was "like calling the hound of the Baskervilles 'Rover.'" As Opposition Front Bench Spokesman on Scottish Affairs, Taylor said in November 1974 that a general directive to the National Coal Board should follow the guidelines of the Social Contract in any wage settlement. He said that the Labour government were being "thoroughly cowardly and hypocritical over the Social Contract" and asked the government spokesman in the House of Commons whether it was "just a sick joke". He was politically close to Margaret Thatcher and served as her Shadow Secretary of State for Scotland. 

Whilst Shadow Secretary of State for Scotland, the Conservatives stood on a policy staunchly against Scottish devolution. Although Taylor strongly agreed with this, he knew and warned Thatcher that by standing on a platform against devolution, which Labour were promising for at the next election, that moderate SNP voters who favoured devolution but not necessarily independence would switch to Labour, hence endangering Taylor's marginal seat, which he had held by 1,757 votes in October 1974. He was expected to become Thatcher's Secretary of State for Scotland if he had held his seat at the 1979 election. 20 years later, during a Commons debate on devolution in 1999 at the prelude of the Scottish Parliament, he said: "Unfortunately, as I warned Lady Thatcher, making the SNP vote disappear meant that the then Member of Parliament for Glasgow, Cathcart had to disappear as well. However, it was a good bargain for Scotland to get rid of the SNP and devolution, even if it meant that I had to go as well." In any case, he was back in Parliament within a year of his defeat, although he would never serve in government.

Monday Club
He was a leading and early (pre-1966) young member of the old Conservative Monday Club, and was on the platform at the Club's very successful rally at the Scottish Conservative Party's annual conference at Perth on 17 May 1968. He was first co-opted onto the Club's Executive Council on 9 September 1968. He is listed in a Club circular as one of its members standing for parliament in the General Election on 9 June 1983, for Southend East, and was elected deputy Chairman of the Club on 23 June that year. He consistently opposed the EEC and the EU and campaigned for the UK to leave. He was a leading campaigner against joining the euro and had also campaigned against metrication. Throughout his career he fought hard for the interests of British fishermen. On behalf of the Monday Club, in June 1974, he launched an attack on vandalism, saying in the House of Commons that those who defaced public buildings with aerosol paint should be made to clean the buildings themselves.

Taylor sought leave to introduce a bill in parliament in October 1974 to restore capital punishment. The following January, referring to the murder of a London policeman by a Provisional Irish Republican Army gunman, he said that "the answer was return of capital punishment" and added that "if the police want arms, no government could now refuse". He was on the editorial board that prepared the Club's October 1985 Conservative Party Conference issue of their newspaper, Right Ahead, to which he contributed a lengthy article entitled How Tories are Subsidising the Soviet War Machine. In the mid-1980s he said, "Nelson Mandela should be shot." On 30 March 1990, he was the guest speaker at the Club's Surrey branch 21st Anniversary Dinner and was still a Vice-President in 1992. He was guest-of-honour at the South East Essex Monday Club's Annual Dinner on 4 July 1997.

Change of seats
At the 1979 election, Scotland bucked the British trend by showing a slight swing from Conservative to Labour, and Taylor lost his seat, the only Conservative MP at that election (other than by-election victors) to do so. He had been widely expected to become the Secretary of State for Scotland. Taylor re-entered Parliament at a 1980 by-election for Southend East following the death of Stephen McAdden and then, from 1997, represented Rochford and Southend East. He did not serve in government after his return but received a knighthood in 1991.

Prior to being selected to fight the Southend by-election, Taylor had been a candidate for the Rectorship of the University of Dundee. He was a favourite to win but pulled out of the election at the last minute to contest the parliamentary seat.

During John Major's government, he was one of the Maastricht Rebels and was temporarily expelled from the parliamentary party, although he was later reinstated. Taylor stood down at the 2005 general election.

Later life

In 1994, Taylor made an idiosyncratic appearance on the BBC comedy panel show Have I Got News for You. He appeared to be unaware of the light-hearted nature of the programme and so attempted to use it as a forum for serious political debate. He was interviewed in 2012 as part of The History of Parliament's oral history project.  Taylor campaigned for a 'leave' vote in the 2016 United Kingdom European Union membership referendum.

In 1996 the Industrial metal band Ministry released the album Filth Pig, which derives its name from Taylor describing the bands' singer as a "filthy pig" in the Houses of Parliament.

Taylor was a fan of Bob Marley.

Taylor died on 20 September 2017, having been ill for some months. He was 80 years old.

References

Sources

 Copping, Robert, The Monday Club – Crisis and After, Current Affairs Information Service, Ilford, Essex, May 1975, (P/B), pps: 17, 20, 22
 Taylor, Teddy, MP, and David Storey, The Conservative Party & The Common Market, published by the Conservative Monday Club, July 1982, (P/B)
 Taylor, Teddy, MP, Proposals to Rescue the British Fishing Industry, Monday Club Policy Paper, December 1982
 Taylor, Teddy, MP, How Tories are Subsidising the Soviet War Machine, in Right Ahead newspaper published by the Conservative Monday Club, October 1985 Conservative Party Conference issue
 Taylor, Teddy, MP, The EEC – The Other Side of the Coin, in Right Ahead newspaper published by the Conservative Monday Club, October 1989 Conservative Party Conference issue

External links
 
 Facts about Teddy Taylor TheyWorkForYou.com
 Guardian obituary

People educated at the High School of Glasgow
Members of the Parliament of the United Kingdom for Glasgow constituencies
Conservative Party (UK) MPs for English constituencies
Councillors in Glasgow
Scottish journalists
UK MPs 1964–1966
UK MPs 1966–1970
UK MPs 1970–1974
UK MPs 1974
UK MPs 1974–1979
UK MPs 1979–1983
UK MPs 1983–1987
UK MPs 1987–1992
UK MPs 1992–1997
UK MPs 1997–2001
UK MPs 2001–2005
1937 births
2017 deaths
Knights Bachelor
Politicians awarded knighthoods
Scottish Conservative Party MPs
Unionist Party (Scotland) councillors
Unionist Party (Scotland) MPs
British Eurosceptics